Voetbalvereniging UNA ("Uitspanning Na Arbeid") is a football club from Zeelst, Netherlands. They play at the 2,000-capacity Hoofdveld at Sportpark Zeelst.

Founded on 7 November 1929, the club currently competes in the Derde Divisie, the fourth tier of football in the Netherlands, after being relegated from the Tweede Divisie in 2017.
`

Honours

External links
Official website 
Sportpark Zeelst

 
Football clubs in the Netherlands
Association football clubs established in 1929
1929 establishments in the Netherlands
Football clubs in Veldhoven